Major Somnath Sharma, PVC (31 January 1923 – 3 November 1947), was an officer of the Indian Army, and the first recipient of the Param Vir Chakra (PVC), India's highest military decoration, which he was awarded posthumously.

Sharma was commissioned into the 8th Battalion, 19th Hyderabad Regiment, in 1942. He served in Burma during the Arakan Campaign of World War II, for which he was mentioned in despatches. Fighting in the Indo-Pakistani War of 1947-1948, Somnath Sharma was killed in action on 3 November 1947 while repulsing Pakistani infiltrators near Srinagar Airport. For his gallantry and sacrifice during the Battle of Badgam, he was posthumously awarded the Param Vir Chakra.

Early life and education

Sharma was born into a Dogra Brahmin family on 31 January 1923 at Dadh, Kangra, Punjab (present day Himachal Pradesh). His father, Amar Nath Sharma, was a military officer. Several of his siblings served in the military. His younger brother, Vishwa Nath Sharma, would later become the 14th Chief of the Army Staff of the Indian Army. Somnath Sharma completed his schooling at Sherwood College, Nainital, before enrolling at the Prince of Wales Royal Military College in Dehradun. He later studied at the Royal Military College, Sandhurst. During his childhood, Somnath was influenced by the teachings of Krishna and Arjuna in the Bhagavad Gita, taught to him by his grandfather.

Military career

On 22 February 1942, upon his graduation from the Royal Military College, Sharma was commissioned into the 9th Battalion, 19th34Hyderabad Regiment, of the British Indian Army (later to become the Indian Army's 4th Battalion, Kumaon Regiment). During World War II, he saw action against the Japanese in Burma during the Arakan Campaign. At that time he served under the command of Colonel K. S. Thimmayya, who would later rise to the rank of general and become Chief of the Army Staff from 1957 to 1961. Sharma was mentioned in despatches for his actions during the fighting of the Arakan Campaign. The award was gazetted in January 1946.

Throughout his military career, Sharma was influenced by his uncle Captain K. D. Vasudeva's gallantry in action. Vasudeva also served with the 8th Battalion, participating in the Malayan Campaign during which he died aiding hundreds of soldiers under his command to survive from the Japanese offensive.

Battle of Badgam:Somnath Sharma

On 27 October 1947, a contingent of troops of the Indian Army was air-lifted into Srinagar in response to the invasion by Pakistan on 22 October into the Kashmir Valley(sonkmark). On 31 October, D Company of 4th Battalion of Kumaon Regiment, under the command of Sharma, was flown in to Srinagar. During this time, his left hand was in a plaster cast as a result of injuries sustained previously on the hockey field, but he insisted on being with his company in combat and was subsequently given permission to go.

On 3 November, a batch of three companies was deployed to the Badgam area on patrol duties. Their objective was to check the infiltrators moving toward Srinagar city area from the north. As there was no enemy movement, two of the three deployed companies returned to Srinagar at 2:00pm. However, Sharma's D Company, was ordered to stay in position until 3:00pm. At 2:35pm, Sharma's company was fired upon from the local resident houses in Badgam but counter-fire was not ordered to avoid injuring or killing innocent civilians. Suddenly, a tribal lashkar (English: militiamen) of 700 infiltrators approached the Badgam from the direction of Gulmarg. D Company was soon surrounded from three sides and sustained heavy casualties from mortar fire. Sharma realized the importance of holding onto his position as both the city of Srinagar and the airport would be vulnerable if lost. Under heavy fire, and outnumbered by a ratio of seven to one, he urged his company to fight bravely, often exposing himself to the enemy fire as he ran from one post to the other.

When heavy casualties adversely affected the company's firing power, Sharma took upon himself the task of distributing ammunition to his men, operating light machine guns. While busy fighting the infiltrators, a mortar shell exploded on a pile of ammunition near him. Before he succumbed to his injuries, he transmitted a message to his brigade's headquarters which read:

By the time a relief company, from the 1st Battalion of the Kumaon Regiment, reached Badgam, the position held by Sharma's company had been overrun. However, the 200 casualties suffered by the tribal infiltrators caused them to lose the impetus to advance. This bought time for Indian forces to fly into Srinagar airfield and block all routes of ingress to Srinagar itself. During the battle, along with Sharma, one junior commissioned officer and 20 other ranks of D company were killed in action. Sharma's body was recovered three days later. Though it was disfigured beyond recognition, his body was identified by means of the leather holster of his pistol and a few pages of Bhagavad Gita in his chest pocket.

Receiving the Param Vir Chakra

On 21 June 1950, Somnath Sharma's award of the Param Vir Chakra, for his actions on 3 November 1947 in defending the Srinagar airport, was gazetted.Major General Amarnath Sharma received India's first and highest war-time gallantry medal, Param Vir Chakra, on behalf of his brave son. This was the first time the honour had been awarded since its inception. Coincidentally, Savitri Khanolkar, the mother-in-law of Sharma's brother, was the designer of the Param Vir Chakra.

The official citation reads:

legacy of late major Somnath Sharma

In the 1980s, the Shipping Corporation of India (SCI), a Government of India enterprise under the aegis of the Ministry of Shipping, named fifteen of their crude oil tankers in honour of the Param Vir Chakra recipients. The crude oil tanker named MT Major Somnath Sharma, PVC was delivered to SCI on 11 June 1984. The tanker was phased out after 25 years service.

In popular culture

The first episode of the TV series on the lives of Param Vir Chakra recipients, Param Vir Chakra (1988) covered Sharma's actions of 3 November 1947. In that episode, his part was played by Farooque Sheikh. The episode was directed by Chetan Anand.

Notes
Footnotes

Citations

References

External links

 
 

Indian military personnel killed in action
Recipients of the Param Vir Chakra
1923 births
1947 deaths
Rashtriya Indian Military College alumni
People of the Indo-Pakistani War of 1947